The 1986 Greek Basketball Super Cup was the 1st edition of the professional basketball national domestic super cup competition of Greece, the Greek Basketball Super Cup. The first Greek Basketball Super Cup was held prior to the start of the 1986–87 season, and it was organised under the auspices of the Hellenic Basketball Federation (E.O.K.). It was contested between the 1985–86 Greek Basket League season champions, Aris Thessaloniki, and the 1985–86 Greek Basketball Cup winners, Panathinaikos Athens. 

In subsequent seasons, Aris went on to win both the Greek League championship and the Greek Cup (the domestic double title), for the next four consecutive seasons (1986–87, 1987–88, 1988–89, and 1989–90). So there was no reason to hold the Greek Super Cup over those next four seasons. However, the Greek Super Cup was revived much later, with the 2020 edition of the competition, under the auspices of the Hellenic Basketball Clubs Association (HEBA), using a different four-team format.

Competition format
The competition was played between the 1985–86 Greek Basket League champions, Aris, and the 1985–86 Greek Basketball Cup winners, Panathinaikos Athens. It was contested as a two-legged, home-and-away, aggregate score competition. With the first game taking place in Thessaloniki, where Aris is based, and the second game taking place in Athens, where Panathinaikos is based. Aris won the first game in Thessaloniki, by a score of 117–85, and the second game in Athens, by a score of 104–88, thereby easily winning the Super Cup, by an overall aggregate score of (221–173).

Score sheets

Finals top scorer
 Nikos Galis – 42.5 PPG (2 games)

See also 
Greek Basket League
Greek Basketball Cup
HEBA Greek All-Star Game
Hellenic Basketball Federation (E.O.K.)
Hellenic Basketball Association (HEBA)

References

External links
 Official Hellenic Basketball Federation Site 
 Official Greek Basket League Site 

Greek Basketball Super Cup
1986–87 in Greek basketball